A Maid of Belgium is a 1917 American silent drama film directed by George Archainbaud and starring Alice Brady, Louise de Rigney and George MacQuarrie.

Cast
 Alice Brady as Adoree 
 Louise de Rigney as Claire Hudson 
 George MacQuarrie as Roger Hudson 
 Richard Clarke as Rollins 
 Lotta Burnell as Joan 
 Tony Merlo as Dr. Thorn

References

Bibliography
 James Robert Parish & Michael R. Pitts. Film directors: a guide to their American films. Scarecrow Press, 1974.

External links
 

1917 films
1917 drama films
1910s English-language films
American silent feature films
Silent American drama films
Films directed by George Archainbaud
American black-and-white films
World Film Company films
Films shot in Fort Lee, New Jersey
1910s American films